Nosotros los pobres, is a Mexican telenovela directed by Enrique Segoviano for Televisa in 1973.  This is a remake of old Mexican movie of 1948 Nosotros los pobres with Pedro Infante.

Cast 
Alberto Vázquez
Lupita Lara
Norma Lazareno
Narciso Busquets
María Teresa Rivas
Dalilah Polanco as Chachita
Lucha Villa
Miguel Manzano
Adalberto Martínez
Sonia Amelio
Lilia Prado
Rosario Granados
José Luis Jiménez
Ernesto Gómez Cruz
Eduardo López Rojas
Susana Cabrera

References

External links 

Mexican telenovelas
1973 telenovelas
Televisa telenovelas
Spanish-language telenovelas
1973 Mexican television series debuts
1973 Mexican television series endings